This is a list of diplomatic missions in Zimbabwe. The capital of the country, Harare, currently hosts 50 embassies.  Several other countries have ambassadors accredited from other capital cities, mainly Pretoria and Addis Ababa. Some countries have closed their embassies in Zimbabwe in recent years in protest at the policies of President Robert Mugabe.

Diplomatic missions in Harare

Embassies

Other posts and delegations 
 (Delegation)
 (Trade office)

Consular missions

Mutare
 (Consulate-General)

Non-resident embassies 
Resident in Pretoria, South Africa

Resident in other cities

Closed missions

See also 
 Foreign relations of Zimbabwe

References

External links
 Ministry of Foreign Affairs of Zimbabwe

 
Zimbabwe
Diplomatic missions